Cheseaux may refer to:
 Cheseaux-sur-Lausanne is a municipality in Switzerland
 Cheseaux-Noréaz is a municipality in Switzerland
 Jean-Philippe de Cheseaux was a Swiss astronomer